The forest batis or short-tailed batis (Batis mixta) is a species of bird in the wattle-eye family, Platysteiridae occurring in eastern Africa.

Taxonomy
The forest batis was described by the English ornithologist George Ernest Shelley in 1889 and given the binomial name Pachypora mixta. It is now placed in the genus Batis  that was introduced by the German zoologist Friedrich Boie in 1833. The specific epithet mixta is Latin for "mixed" or "mingled". Reichenow's batis (Batis reichenowi) was formerly treated as a subspecies. The forest batis is now treated as monotypic.

Description
The adult male has bluish grey upperparts with a black mask across the face, a white spot on the lores and white spots on the rump which are revealed when the long feathers are fluffed out. The underparts are white with a black breast band and blackish thighs. The wings are black with a white stripe, the bill and legs are black while the eyes are red. Females are similar in pattern but the upper part colour is more olive in tone, the wings more reddish brown and has a mottled rufous breast band and browner wings. Juveniles similar to female but markings less well differentiated. The short black tail is edged with white.

Distribution and habitat
The forest batis is found in east Africa from the south eastern coast of Kenya and north eastern Tanzania including Mount Kilimanjaro, along the northern Eastern Arc Mountains of Tanzania, i.e. Nguru, Nguu, Usambara Mountains, Pare and Kilimanjaro.  It is also found in coastal south eastern Tanzania.
 
It frequents the lower levels of forest and the undergrowth.

Behaviour
The habits of the forest batis are little known, there have been indications of breeding behaviour in May and June in Kenya, September and October in Tanzania and a single nest with a clutch of 2 eggs has been recorded. Like other batises the largest groups seen are small family groups and pairs are territorial. Calling males make a repetitive, slow series of hu-hu-hu-hu whistles and they puff their white throat feathers out while performing this song.

References

 Fjeldså, Jon; Bowie, Rauri C. K. & Kiure, Jacob (2006) The forest batis, Batis mixta, is two species: description of a new, narrowly distributed Batis species in the Eastern Arc biodiversity hotspot., Journal of Ornithology, 147 (4): 578–590.

forest batis
Birds of East Africa
forest batis
Taxonomy articles created by Polbot